Aì Qīng (March 27, 1910 – May 5, 1996), born Jiang Zhenghan and styled Jiang Haicheng, is regarded by some as one of the finest modern Chinese poets. He was known under his pen names Linbi, Ke'a and Ejia.

Life
Ai Qing was born in Fantianjiang village, Jinhua county, in eastern China's Zhejiang province. After entering Hangzhou Xihu Art School in 1928, on the advice of principal Lin Fengmian, he went abroad and studied in Paris the following spring. From 1929 to 1932 while studying in France, besides learning art of Renoir and Van Gogh, the philosophy of Kant and Hegel, he also studied modern poets such as Mayakovsky and was especially influenced by Belgian poet Verhaeren.

After returning to Shanghai, China in May 1932, he joined China Left Wing Artist Association, and was arrested in July for opposing the Kuomintang. During his imprisonment, Ai Qing translated Verhaeren's poems and wrote his first book Dayanhe—My Nanny, "Reed Flute", and "Paris". He was finally released in October 1935.

After the start of the Second Sino-Japanese War in 1937, Ai Qing wrote "Snow falls on China's Land" after arriving at Wuhan to support the war effort. In 1938, he moved to Guilin to become the editor of Guixi Daily newspaper. In 1940, he became the dean of the Chinese department at Chongqing YuCai University.

In 1941, he moved to Yan'an, and joined the Chinese Communist Party in the subsequent year.
Beginning in 1949, he was on cultural committees.
He was editor of Poetry Magazine, and associate editor of People's Literature.

However, in 1957, during the Anti-Rightist Movement, he defended Ding Ling and was accused of "rightism". He was exiled to farms in northeast China in 1958 and was transferred to Xinjiang in 1959 by the Communist authorities. During the period of the Cultural Revolution he was forced to work daily cleaning the communal toilets for his village of about 200 people, a physically demanding job he was required to carry out for five years, then aged in his 60s. According to an account by his son Ai Weiwei, he lost vision in one of his eyes due to lack of nutrition. He was not allowed to publish his works Return Song and Ode to Light until he was reinstated in 1979.
In 1979, he was vice-chairman of the Chinese Writers Association.

He made a second journey to France in 1980, and in 1985 French president François Mitterrand awarded him the title of Commander of the Order of Arts and Letters.

Family
He is the father of the prominent Chinese artist and activist Ai Weiwei, who participated in designing the Beijing National Stadium, and the painter Ai Xuan. He had two daughters with his second wife.

Pen name
In 1933, while being tortured and imprisoned by the Kuomintang and writing his book Dayan River — My Nanny, he went to write his surname (Jiang), but stopped at the first component "艹" due to his bitterness towards KMT leader Chiang Kai-shek. He resented sharing the same surname (Jiang/Chiang) and simply crossed out the rest of the character with an "X". This happens to be the Chinese character ài, and since the rest of his name, Hǎi Chéng meant the limpidity of the sea, it implied the color of limpid water qīng (青, turquoise, blue, or green), so he adopted the pen name Ai Qing.

Works
Kuangye (1940; “Wildness”)
Xiang taiyang (1940 “Toward the Sun”)
Beifang (1942; “North”)
Guilai de ge (1980; “Song of Returning”)
Ai Qing quanji (“The Complete Works of Ai Qing”) in 1991.

Works in French
Le chant de la lumière «Guang de zange » , éditor, translator Ng Yok-Soon. Ed. les Cent fleurs, 1989
 De la poésie ; Du poète / Ai Qing  « Shilun » , translator Chantal Chen-Andro, Wang Zaiyuan, Ballouhey, Centre de recherche de l’Université de Paris VIII, 1982
''Poèmes / Ai Ts’ing, éditor, translator Catherine Vignal. Publications orientalistes de France, 1979.
Le récif : poèmes et fables / Ai Qing, éditor, translator Ng Yok-Soon. Ed. les Cent fleurs, 1987

Works in German
 Manfred und Shuxin Reinhardt (ed. and transl.): Auf der Waage der Zeit. Gedichte. Volk und Welt, Berlin 1988 (in Nachdichtungen von Annemarie Bostroem)
 Susanne Hornfeck (ed. and transl.): Schnee fällt auf Chinas Erde. Gedichte. Penguin Verlag, München 2021

Works in English
Eugene Chen Eoyang (ed), Selected Poems of Ai Qing, Indiana University Press, 1982

Anthologies

See also
 1000 Years of Joys and Sorrows - A memoir by Ai Weiwei which discusses Ai Qing

References

Further reading
 Chinese Writers on Writing featuring Ai Qing. Ed. Arthur Sze. (Trinity University Press, 2010).

Portrait 
    Ai Qing. A Portrait by Kong Kai Ming at Portrait Gallery of Chinese Writers (Hong Kong Baptist University Library).

Sources
 Columbia Encyclopedia
 Obituary 
 asiaweek.com Obituary
 Ai Qing Museum 

1910 births
1996 deaths
Republic of China poets
People's Republic of China poets
Writers from Jinhua
Victims of human rights abuses
20th-century Chinese poets
Poets from Zhejiang
Victims of the Anti-Rightist Campaign